Đỗ Tiến Tuấn (born 3 September 1967) is a Vietnamese boxer. He competed in the men's welterweight event at the 1988 Summer Olympics. In 1999, he was convicted of murder and sent to prison for life.

References

External links
 

1967 births
Living people
Vietnamese male boxers
Olympic boxers of Vietnam
Boxers at the 1988 Summer Olympics
Place of birth missing (living people)
Welterweight boxers